Live at Winterland is a live album by The Jimi Hendrix Experience. It compiles performances from the band's three concerts at the Winterland Ballroom in San Francisco, where they played two shows each night on October 10, 11 and 12, 1968. The album was released posthumously by Rykodisc in 1987 and was the first Hendrix release to be specifically conceived for the compact disc format.

Release and reception 
Live at Winterland was released by Rykodisc in 1987 and became the best-selling album from an independent label that year. With sales of over 200,000 copies, it sold more than any other Jimi Hendrix recording had in years. In a contemporary review for The Village Voice, music critic Robert Christgau was highly impressed by the performances compiled for the album, which he said is ideal for the emerging CD format and surpasses previous live recordings of Hendrix: "The sound is bigger and better in every way for an artist whose sound was his music". He named Live at Winterland the tenth best album of 1987 in his year-end list for The Village Voice. Christgau remarked on its significance to Hendrix's discography in a retrospective review for Blender magazine:

In 1992, Live at Winterland was re-released with a bonus disc, which contained three additional songs from the same concerts. A 4 disc box set (titled Winterland) drawn from all 6 performances was released on September 12, 2011. A limited edition sold exclusively on Amazon.com includes a 5th bonus disc containing a bootleg soundboard recording of a performance at the Fillmore Auditorium on February 4, 1968.

Track listing
All songs were written by Jimi Hendrix, except where noted.

Personnel
Credits are adapted from AllMusic.

The Jimi Hendrix Experience
 Jimi Hendrix – guitar, vocals
 Mitch Mitchell – drums
 Noel Redding – bass guitar, backing vocals on track 2 & 11

Additional personnel
 Chip Branton – producer
 Jack Casady – bass guitar on track 7
 Alan Douglas – producer
 Mark Linett – engineer

See also
 Jimi Hendrix discography

References

Bibliography

Further reading

External links 
 
 

Live albums published posthumously
Jimi Hendrix live albums
1987 live albums
Albums produced by Alan Douglas (record producer)
Rykodisc live albums